Noah Mawete Kinsiona (born 17 October 2005) is a Belgian footballer who currently plays as a midfielder for Standard Liège.

Career statistics

Club

Notes

References

2005 births
Living people
Belgian footballers
Belgium youth international footballers
Belgian sportspeople of Democratic Republic of the Congo descent
Association football midfielders
Belgian Pro League players
Standard Liège players